The Federal Correctional Complex, Coleman (FCC Coleman) is a United States federal prison complex for male inmates in unincorporated Sumter County, Florida, near Wildwood. It is operated by the Federal Bureau of Prisons (BOP), a division of the United States Department of Justice.

The complex has  of space.  the complex, the largest correctional facility operated in the nation, altogether houses 7,120 prisoners, and 1,300 employees, making it one of the largest employers in the county. Most prisoners are sentenced for drug-related crimes, and most of the inmates had not been convicted of violent acts. According to Rachel Monroe of The Atlantic, the prison has held several unusual or notable criminals. 

Prisoners are male with the exception of those in the female work camp. The prisoners on average have sentences of 10 years. Press reports indicate female prisoners have been raped by staff, and that widespread sexual abuse has been tolerated. Prosecutors have been unable to prosecute cases against the employees due to lack of evidence. 

The complex consists of four facilities:

Federal Correctional Institution, Coleman Low (FCI Coleman Low): a low-security facility.
Federal Correctional Institution, Coleman Medium (FCI Coleman Medium): a medium-security facility with an adjacent satellite prison camp for minimum-security inmates.
United States Penitentiary I, Coleman (USP Coleman I): a high-security facility.
United States Penitentiary II, Coleman (USP Coleman II): a high-security facility.

See also

List of United States federal prisons
Incarceration in the United States

References

Coleman
Buildings and structures in Sumter County, Florida
Prisons in Florida